Dover is a residential neighbourhood in the southeast quadrant of Calgary, Alberta. It is bounded by 26 Avenue SE to the north, Peigan Trail to the south, 24 Street SE and Deerfoot Trail to the west and 36 Street SE to the east. The Inglewood golf course, developed in the Bow River valley, borders the community to the west.

The area was annexed to the City of Calgary in 1961, and Dover was established in 1971. It is represented in the Calgary City Council by the Ward 9 councillor.

The postal code in this area is T2B.

Demographics

Residents in this community had a median household income of $43,875 in 2000, and there were 23.9% low income residents living in the neighbourhood. As of 2000, 15.5% of the residents were immigrants. A proportion of 29.4% of the buildings were condominiums or apartments, and 32.8% of the housing was used for renting.

Education
The community is served by Ian Bazalgette Junior High, Forest Lawn Senior High, Valley View Elementary and West Dover Elementary public schools as well as by Holy Cross Elementary & Junior High and Saint Damien Elementary (Catholic schools).

See also
List of neighbourhoods in Calgary

References

External links
Dover Community Association

Neighbourhoods in Calgary